Twomile Creek (also called Two Mile Branch) is a stream in Knox and Macon Counties in the U.S. state of Missouri. It is a tributary of the North Fork Salt River.

Twomile Creek is about two miles from Locust Hill, which may account for the name.

See also
List of rivers of Missouri

References

Rivers of Knox County, Missouri
Rivers of Macon County, Missouri
Rivers of Missouri